B55 may refer to :
 Bundesstraße 55, a German road
 Karoonda Highway, a road in South Australia
 HLA-B55, an HLA-B serotype

B-55 may refer to :
 Boeing XB-55, an aircraft